is a sexual practice that consists of a person being carried by their partner while having sex with them.

Etymology
The act itself is named after the box that is filled with food that is sold by vendors walking around train stations or sporting events, ekiben. The term was first popularized by Japanese male actor, Chocoball Mukai.

Practice
The act usually involves a male partner lifting his female partner face to face with his penis inserted inside her vagina, and having sex while standing. The term can also apply when then act is done sitting down or when the lifted partner is held against a wall. The act has begun popular and gain notoriety similar to bukkake for its unique form and origin in Japan. Some films will sometimes feature the sex act with the male carrying the female actress and run around while having sex with them depending on the scene or scenario.

See also
Bukkake
Pornography in Japan

References

External links 

Japanese sex terms
Pornography terminology
Sexual acts
Sexuality in Japan